Pleasant Password Server is a proprietary, multi-user enterprise password server that is fully compatible with a modified version of the KeePass Password Safe.  Designed for business users, the password server provides access provisioning as well as per-group and per-entry access restrictions.  Pleasant Password Server supports the use of secure passwords, allowing system administrators to manage user passwords from a central web interface.

The password software extends to desktop and mobile environments, and is tested for compatibility with Chrome, Firefox, Internet Explorer, Opera, Android devices, iOS devices as well as other web browsers.  Developed by Pleasant Solutions Inc., product pricing is based upon the number of software users licensed for the product, the length of product support as well as product upgrades.

Features 

Pleasant Password Server - Standard Edition forms the core product that is built into all other versions.  The standard server stores user passwords and login information using a secure database that is managed internally by the company. All versions of the software maintain a core feature set, including:
 Single Password: user names, passwords and website information are secured by single master password that is unique for each user.
 KeePass Compatibility: support for most KeePass plug-ins.
 A web client permits user access outside the company intranet, using any operating system.
 Multiple Language Extensions: over 40 language translations available for download.
 Automatic clipboard erase & random password generator for work teams.
 Ability to disable users when they have left the company, freezing further credential access.

Pleasant Password Server - Enterprise Edition includes additional features, primarily:
 Active Directory/LDAP Integration: Import, export and synchronization with existing LDAP databases.
 Customize or modify access and permissions granted to a user or role.
 View access and permissions granted to a user or role.
 Logging of when passwords were accessed, with export to .csv file.

Pleasant Solutions Inc. has also developed a password proxy module which prevents credentials from being stored on user devices, shielding enterprise passwords from users.

See also 

 Comparison of password managers
 List of password managers
 Password manager
 Cryptography
 Encryption

References

External links 
 
 Pleasant Password Server - Change Log

Password managers
Cryptographic software